The Third North Carolina Provincial Congress was the third of five extra-legal unicameral bodies that met between 1774 and 1776 in North Carolina.  They were modeled after the colonial lower house (House of Burgesses).  These congresses created a government structure, issued bills of credit to pay for the movement, and organized an army for defense, in preparation for the state of North Carolina.   These congresses paved the way for the first meeting of the North Carolina General Assembly on April 7, 1777 in New Bern, North Carolina.

The third congress met in Hillsborough, from August 20 to September 10, 1775.  Its president was Samuel Johnston (The Second congress president, John Harvey had recently died).

Legislation
This congress, which included representatives of all 35 counties and nine towns (also called districts), officially established itself as the highest governmental body in the province after British Governor Josiah Martin had fled, ending royal government rule.  The last Province of North Carolina General Assembly had met on April 48, 1775 before Governor Martin disbanded its House of Burgesses.

The congress divided the state into 6 military districts for purposes of organizing militia and for determining representation on a new Provincial Council.  These districts included Edenton, Halifax, Hillsborough, New Bern, Salisbury, and Wilmington.  Later, an additional district, Morgan, was added for the western part of the state, including counties that eventually became part of Tennessee (Davidson, Greene, and Washington).  Much of the deliberations of the congress dealt with safety of its residents and preparation for war with Great Britain.

Provincial Council and Committees of Safety
To govern North Carolina when the congress was not in session, a 13-member Provincial Council was elected, constituting the first executive body in a North Carolina free of British rule. Cornelius Harnett was elected as the first president of the council.

The following members were elected to the council by the delegates:
 The Honorable Samuel Johnston, Esquire; Cornelius Harnett and Samuel Ashe, Esquires, Wilmington District
 Thomas Jones and Whitmell Hill, Esquires, Edenton District
 Abner Nash and James Coor, Esquires, New Bern District
 Thomas Person and John Kinchen, Esquires, Hillsborough District
 Willie Jones and Thomas Eaton, Esquires, Halifax District
 Samuel Spencer and Waightstill Avery, Esquires, Salisbury District

The delegates formed a Committee of Safety at the state level.  The delegates also elected members of the military district Committees of Safety "for their common defence against their Enemies, for the Security of their Liberties and properties".  These committees at the district level would become the roots of the militias.  The following persons were elected to the Committees of Safety for military districts:
 Wilmington District: Frederick Jones, Sampson Mosely, Archibald Maclaine, Richard Quince, Thomas Davis, William Cray, Henry Rhodes, Thomas Routledge, James Kenan, Alexander McAlister, George Mylne, John Smith and Benjamin Stone.
 Edenton District:  Luke Sumner, William Gray, John Johnston, Thomas Benbury, Gideon Lamb, Joseph Jones, Miles Harvey, Lawrence Baker, Kenneth McKinzie, Stevens Lee, Charles Blount, Isaac Gregory and Day Ridley.
 Hillsborough District:  William Taylor, Joseph Taylor, Samuel Smith, John Atkinson, John Butler, William Johnston, John Hinton, Joel Lane, Michael Rogers, Ambrose Ramsey, Mial Scurlock, John Thompson and John Lark.
 New Bern District:  John Easton, Major Croom, Roger Ormond, Edward Salter, George Barrow, William Thomson, William Tisdale, Benjamin Williams, Richard Ellis, Richard Cogdell, William Brown, James Glasgow and Alexander Gaston.
 Salisbury District:  John Crawford, James Auld, Hezekiah Alexander, Benjamin Patten, John Brevard, Griffith Rutherford, William Hill, John Hamlin, Charles Galloway, William Dent, Robert Ewart and Maxwell Chambers.
 Halifax District:  James Leslie, John Bradford, David Sumner, Allen Jones, William Eaton, Drury Gee, John Norwood, the Revd Henry Pattillo, James Mills, William Bellamy, William Haywood, Duncan Lamon and John Webb.

Delegates

There were 213 delegates, representing 35 counties and 8 towns/districts in North Carolina.

Notes:

References

 Provincial Third
Provincial Third
1775 establishments in North Carolina
Provincial Third
North Carolina